Kathayariyathe is a 1981 Indian Malayalam film, directed by Mohan and produced by A. Raghunath. The film stars Srividya, Sukumaran, M. G. Soman and Ranipadmini in the lead roles. The film has musical score by G. Devarajan.

Cast
Srividya as Geetha
Sukumaran as Vishnu
M. G. Soman as Viswanathan
Ranipadmini as Usha
Sai Kumar as Shaji
Reghu as Gopi
bahadoor as Raman Nair

Soundtrack
The music was composed by G. Devarajan and the lyrics were written by M. D. Rajendran.

References

External links
 
 Kathayariyathe on YouTube 1981

1981 films
1980s Malayalam-language films